Penicillium occitanis is a species of fungus in the genus Penicillium which produces cellulase and pectinase. The mutant Pol6 produces a very high amount of cellulase and pectinase. This mutant might be used for industrial use.

Further reading

References 

occitanis
Fungi described in 1990